The 1953 All-American Girls Professional Baseball League season marked the eleventh season of the circuit. The teams Fort Wayne Daisies, Grand Rapids Chicks, Kalamazoo Lassies, Muskegon Belles, Rockford Peaches and South Bend Blue Sox competed through a 110-game schedule, while the Shaugnessy playoffs featured the top four teams. This time, the postseason was reduced to a best-of-three series for both rounds.

The AAGPBL had six teams in 1953, the only change in its lineup being that the Battle Creek Belles had transferred and become the Muskegon Belles. The league was still using a 10 inches ball, but some changes were made to the game to make it more competitive and exciting. The base paths were lengthened from 72 feet to 75 feet and another foot was added to pitching distance, making it 56 feet. Nevertheless,  the new changes had little impact on the game, as the high batting averages and low ERA's remained almost intact compared to the previous year. Joanne Weaver of Fort Wayne won her second batting title in a row with a .346 average, while Jean Faut of South Bend topped the pitching list with a 1.51 ERA. No pitcher won 20 games for the first time in league history. Faut and Grand Rapids' Eleanor Moore tied for first with 17 wins, while Fort Wayne's Betty Foss amassed 144 hits, that would eventually become a single-season record. Faut, who also led the league in strikeouts (143) and hurled her second career perfect game, was honored with the Player of the Year Award, her second in three years.

In the first round of the postseason, first place Fort Wayne faced third place Kalamazoo and second place Grand Rapids drew fourth place Rockford. After a 12-inning, 3–1 victory of Fort Wayne in the series opener, Kalamazoo pitchers Dorothy Naum and Kay Blumetta silenced the powerful Daisies batters in the next two games by scores of 2–1 and 5–3, respectively. In Game 2, Naum helped herself by batting a home run and Jean Lovell singled in the winning run in the top of the 10th inning. Lovell also drove in two runs in Game 3 to help the Lassies advance to the final round.

In the other series, Rockford connected 14 hits in Game 1 and pounded the Chicks, 9–2, while Rose Gacioch scattered eight hits and struck out four batters in a complete game victory. But Earlene Risinger pitched a six-hit, 2–0 shutout in the next game to tie the series. In Game 3, Dorothy Mueller held Rockford to eight hits in a 4–3 win to send Grand Rapids into the finals.

The Chicks swept the Lassies in the final series. In Game 1, Mary Lou Studnicka gave up seven hits and fanned seven in an eight-inning win, 5–2, while Eleanor Moore was credited with the save. Joyce Ricketts led the attack with two runs batted in. Risinger continued her winning ways in Game 2, giving up three runs on seven hits while striking out nine en route to a 4–3 victory. Once again, Ricketts drove in two runs and Risinger even contributed to her own cause with two RBI, to whip Kalamazoo for the championship in a cold-weather, shortened seven-inning game.

Standings

Postseason

Batting statistics

Pitching statistics

All-Star Game

See also
1953 Major League Baseball season
1953 Nippon Professional Baseball season

Sources

External links
 AAGPBL Official Website
 AAGPBL Records
 Baseball Historian files
 The Diamond Angle profiles and interviews
 SABR Projects – Jim Sargent articles
 YouTube videos

All-American Girls Professional Baseball League seasons
1950s in women's baseball
1953 in baseball
All